Acleris hastiana is a moth of the family Tortricidae. It is found in Europe, northern Iran, Kazakhstan, Ala Tau, central Siberia, Irkutsk, the Amur region and China. In North America it is found from the north-eastern United States across southern Canada to British Columbia and south along the Pacific Coast to California.

The wingspan is about 20 mm. It is a very variable species, with dozens of named forms, and many intermediate types, which has led to its description by over 125 synonyms. Some forms closely resemble Acleris cristana so certain identification requires microscopic examination of the genitalia.

Adults are on the wing from June to July and again in August. There are two generations in much of its range.

The larvae feed on Salix species in Europe. First instar larvae bore into buds. Later instars feed in spun leaves. Other recorded food plants include Vaccinium, Andromeda, Ceanothus, Gaylussacia, Quercus and Rhododendron.

References

External links 
 UKmoths
 Fact Sheet

hastiana
Moths of Asia
Moths of North America
Tortricidae of Europe
Moths described in 1758
Taxa named by Carl Linnaeus